is a 1970 Japanese tokusatsu fantasy film directed by Yoshiyuki Kuroda.

Plot 

Sanshiro Yuzuki, the swordfighter's father, was killed by a phantom thief during the night watchman. Sanshiro, who was run away by death and ran to his father's side, was stopped by the yokai Shokera. The kind shokera, who does not resemble the strange appearance, said, "I will help you to avenge my father's death, and he taught me how to make a mysterious and effective elixir. Shokera claims that the effect lasts half an hour, and it is repeated three times before it wears off. Sanshiro was a bear from Nagaya and a childhood friend of mine. He gave me courage and confidence when I drank it. Those rogues who were violent in the bells with medicine surprised him. Sanshiro sneaked in to find the Gennoshin Dojo where the rogues had escaped, but he forgot the passage of time and was sneezed by his disciples. One day, I found that Sosuke, the father of Suzu, was attacked by a phantom thief and was seriously injured and collapsed. Sanshiro in the mysterious world saw a god of death beside Sosuke. Sanshiro sneezes away from the god of death. When Sosuke recovers his energy, Sanshiro is told that Gennoshin is the head of the phantom thief, and Gennoshin heads for the dojo. The movement made the crew go back and forth. However, Sanshiro began to appear when he chased Gennoshin, but Sanshiro's sword, which received Gennoshin's blade, pierced Gennoshin's chest. Sanshiro gained courage and confidence.

Cast 

 Osamu Sakai as Sanshiro Yuzuki, the Invisible Swordsman
 Yoko Atsuta as Orin
 Sanshi Katsura as Dekasuke
 Hachiro Oka as Kumasan
 Yasushi Yokoyama as Maruyoshi
 Kiyoshi Nishikawa as Kadayoshi
 Sonosuke Sawamura II
 Ryutaro Gomi
 Ryosuke Kagawa
 Gen Kimura
 Asao Uchida as Sosuke
 Ikkei Tamaki as Jubei
 Gen Kuroki
 Tokio Oki as Shokera

Release 
The Invisible Swordsman was released in Japan in 1970 on a double bill Gamera vs. Jiger.''

References

Sources

External links 
 

1970 films
1970s fantasy films
Daiei Film films
1970s Japanese films